Juicio Final (2005) (Spanish for "Final  Judgement ") was a professional wrestling major show event produced by Consejo Mundial de Lucha Libre (CMLL) that took place on December 2, 2005 in Arena México, Mexico City, Mexico. This was the twelfth time that CMLL used the name "Jucio Final" for one of their major shows.

The main event of the show was a Lucha de Apuesta, hair vs. hair match between Universo 2000 and Halloween that saw Halloween lose and have all his hair shaved off after the match. The show also featured four traditional six-man "Lucha Libre rules" tag team matches, one featuring the Women's division and three regular male trios matches.

Production

Background
For decades Arena México, the main venue of the Mexican professional wrestling promotion Consejo Mundial de Lucha Libre (CMLL), would close down in early December and remain closed into either January or February to allow for renovations as well as letting Circo Atayde occupy the space over the holidays. As a result, CMLL usually held a "end of the year" supercard show on the first or second Friday of December in lieu of their normal Super Viernes show. 1955 was the first year where CMLL used the name "El Juicio Final" ("The Final Judgement") for their year-end supershow. Until 2000 the Jucio Final name was always used for the year end show, but since 2000 has at times been used for shows outside of December. It is no longer an annually recurring show, but instead held intermittently sometimes several years apart and not always in the same month of the year either. All Juicio Final shows have been held in Arena México in Mexico City, Mexico which is CMLL's main venue, its "home".

Storylines
The event featured five professional wrestling matches with different wrestlers involved in pre-existing scripted feuds, plots and storylines. Wrestlers were portrayed as either heels (referred to as rudos in Mexico, those that portray the "bad guys") or faces (técnicos in Mexico, the "good guy" characters) as they followed a series of tension-building events, which culminated in a wrestling match or series of matches.

Results

References

2005 in professional wrestling
CMLL Juicio Final
December 2005 events in Mexico